Nur Indah Cintra Sukma Munsyi (born 23 September 1957 in Banyuwangi, Indonesia), commonly known as Emilia Contessa is a former Indonesian pop singer and actress. She was a member of the Regional Representative Council, representing East Java, for the 2014-2019 period.

Biography

Early life
Emilia was born Nur Indah Cintra Sukma Munsyi in Banyuwangi on 23 September 1957 to Anna Suriani, a Javanese mother and Hasan Ali, a Pakistani-Madurese father. She is the eldest of the couple's three children.

She started singing at the age of five and her mother became her manager.

Her niece Maharasyi competed in the Voice.

After serving as a member of the Regional Representative Council for the 2014-2019 period, she stood for election for the national parliament, on the ticket of the National Mandate Party, but was not elected.

Discography
 Yatim piatu 
 Masa Depan 
 Sudah Kucoba 
 Burung Sangkar 
 Katakanlah 
 Untuk Apa 
 Mimpi Sedih 
 Malam Yang Dingin 
 Pak Ketipak Ketipung 
 Hitam Manis 
 Sio Mama 
 Penasaran 
 Bimbi 
 Main Tali 
 Kegagalan Cinta 
 Penghibur Hati 
 Layu Sebelum Berkembang 
 Setangkai Bunga Anggrek 
 Nasib Pengembara 
 Samudera Shalawat

Filmography
 Brandal-Brandal Metropolitan (1971)
 Tanah Gersang (1971)
 Dalam Sinar Matanya (1972)
 Pelangi di Langit Singosari (1972)
 Perkawinan (1972)
 Takkan Kulepaskan (1972)
 Dosa di Atas Dosa (1973)
 Akhir Sebuah Impian (1973)
 Tokoh (1973)
 Perempuan (1973)
 Aku Mau Hidup (1974)
 Calon Sarjana (1974)
 Pilih Menantu (1974)
 Ratapan Anak Tiri (1974)
 Tangisan Ibu Tiri (1974)
 Tetesan Air Mata Ibu (1974)
 Benyamin Raja Lenong (1975)
 Senja di Pantai Losari (1975)
 Memble Tapi Kece (1986)

External links
  Profil Emilia Contessa Kapanlagi.com
  Biography Emilia Contessa Wowkeren.com
 
 Instagram Emilia Contessa

References

1957 births
Living people
21st-century Indonesian women politicians
21st-century Indonesian politicians
20th-century Indonesian women singers
Indonesian dance musicians
Indonesian pop singers
Indonesian songwriters
Indonesian female models
Indonesian film actresses
Javanese people
People from Madura Island
Indonesian people of Pakistani descent
People from Banyuwangi Regency
Converts to Islam
Indonesian Muslims